Alistair Smith is the name of:

Alistair Smith (Australian footballer) (born 1990), Australian rules footballer
Alistair Smith (English footballer) (born 1999), English football midfielder